Athanasios Konstantinou (born 18 July 1959 at Athens) is a Greek politician, physician, and retired general officer currently serving as a Member of the European Parliament. He was originally elected as a member of Golden Dawn, but is now an independent politician.

Konstantinou is a graduate of the Corps Officers Military Academy, which educates Hellenic Army officers in the Legal, Medical, Finance, Aviation and Auditing Corps (see Hellenic Military Academy: Overview); and the Medical School of the Aristotle University of Thessaloniki.

As a physician, Konstantinou specialised in the pathology the central nervous and reproductive, systems, molecular pathology, and toxicology in Germany and Austria. Konstantinou speaks English and German, in addition to his native Greek. He retired from the Hellenic Air Force with the rank of taxiarchos, equivalent to a brigadier general or air commodore.

On 15 September 2022, he was one of 16 MEPs who voted against condemning President Daniel Ortega of Nicaragua for human rights violations, in particular the arrest of Bishop Rolando Álvarez.

References

Living people
MEPs for Greece 2019–2024
Golden Dawn (political party) MEPs
Golden Dawn (political party) politicians
Hellenic Air Force officers
Greek physicians
1959 births
People from Athens